Edmond Rugova (born 20 July 1957) is a Yugoslavian football coach and former football player. Rugova formerly coached the Kosovo national football team, a post he held since his appointment by the Football Federation of Kosovo in the summer of 2006 until his departure in July 2009.

Playing career

Club
Before he became the coach of the Kosovo national football team, Edmond Rugova was a famous football player in Kosovo playing for FC Prishtina during the 1980s as part of the so-called "Golden Generation" of Kosovar football players that included Fadil Vokrri, Agim Cana, Fadil Muriqi and others. In his early career he also represented RHMK Kosovo (1977, loan) and KF Liria Prizren (1975–1979). For FC Prishtina (1979–1985), he played 98 league matches and scored 29 goals. He left tension-filled Kosovo for the US and joined New York Cosmos in 1985, then also had a spell with MISL outfit Kansas City Comets.

International
Ruguvoa played for the Yugoslavia national under-20 football team.

Managerial career
Edmond Rugova's first international match as coach of the Kosovo national football team was the international friendly against Saudi Arabia to be played on 15 June 2007, in Ankara, Turkey. While Kosovo was not allowed to UEFA nor FIFA, it was hard to play regular games in the early years.

Edmond Rugova is currently a coach for the Sporting Kansas City Juniors.

Personal life
His son Max was born in Kansas City and plays for FC Pristina.

References

External links
Kosovo national football team info by the Football Federation of Kosovo

1957 births
Living people
Kosovo Albanians
Association football forwards
Yugoslav footballers
Kosovan footballers
KF Liria players
FC Prishtina players
New York Cosmos players
Kansas City Comets (original MISL) players
Major Indoor Soccer League (1978–1992) players
Yugoslav expatriate footballers
Kosovan expatriate footballers
Expatriate soccer players in the United States
Yugoslav expatriate sportspeople in the United States
Kosovan expatriate sportspeople in the United States
Kosovan football managers
Kosovo national football team managers